Conophylline is a autophagy inducing vinca alkaloid found in several species of Tabernaemontana including Ervatamia microphylla and Tabernaemontana divaricata. Among its many functional groups is an epoxide: the compound where that ring is replaced with a double bond is called conophyllidine and this co-occurs in the same plants.

History
Conophylline and conophyllidine were first reported in 1993 after isolation from the ethanol extract of leaves of Tabernaemontana divaricata. Their structures were confirmed by X-ray crystallography. The class of vinca alkaloids to which these compounds belong also contains vincristine and vinblastine, well-known therapeutic agents for human cancers, so they were candidates for a number of biochemical assays to see if they had useful biological activity. By 1996, conophylline it had been reported to inhibit tumours in rats by its action on Ras-expressing cells. This finding did not lead to a useful drug but the molecule continues to be investigated for its biological properties.

Synthesis

Biosynthesis

As with other Indole alkaloids, the biosynthesis of conophylline and conophyllidine starts from the amino acid tryptophan. This is converted into strictosidine before further elaboration and dimerisation.

Chemical synthesis

Fukuyama and coworkers published a total synthesis of conophylline and conophyllidine in 2011. Their strategy was to couple two indoline-containing fragments using a type of Polonovski reaction. The synthesis was challenging owing to the eleven stereogenic centers which have to be controlled. The final products are chiral, and laevorotary.

Natural occurrence
Conophylline and conophyllidine are found in species of the genus Tabernaemontana including Ervatamia microphylla and Tabernaemontana divaricata. The latter species is known to produce many other alkaloids including catharanthine, ibogamine and voacristine.

See also
 Conofoline

References 

Carbazoles
Tryptamine alkaloids